Henry Hurd Swinnerton (1875–1966) was a British geologist. He was professor of geology at University College Nottingham from 1910 to 1946.

Swinnerton was educated at the Royal College of Science, and earned a doctorate in zoology (D.Sc.) from the University of London in July 1902.

In the 1930s Swinnerton was a member of the Fenland Research Committee, contributing valuable knowledge of the geomorphology of the Lincolnshire coast. In 1937 he served as President of the Lincolnshire Naturalists' Union; he gave his Presidential address on "The Problem of the Lincoln Gap". In 1942 he was awarded the Murchison Medal of the Geological Society of London.

Selected bibliography
Swinnerton H.H. (1910) Nottinghamshire, Cambridge County Geographies.
Swinnerton H.H. (1912) The palmistry of the rocks.  Rep Trans Notts Nat Soc; 60: 65–68.
Swinnerton H.H.; Trueman, A.E. (1917).  The Morphology and Development of the Ammonite Septum. Quarterly Journal of the Geological Society, London 73, 26–58
Swinnerton H.H. (1923) Outlines of Palaeontology. Third edition. London, Edward Arnold, 1958.
Swinnerton H.H. (1935)  The Rocks Below the Red Chalk of Lincolnshire, and Their Cephalopod Faunas.  Quarterly Journal of the Geological Society, London 91, 1–46.
Swinnerton H.H. (1937). A monograph of British Lower Cretaceous belemnites. Part 2. Monograph of the Palaeontological Society, 90 (for 1936): xvii-xxxii + 17–30.
Swinnerton H.H. (1938). Presidential Address. The Problem of the Lincoln Gap. Transactions of the Lincolnshire Naturalists' Union 9, 145–153.
Swinnerton H.H. (1941). Further observations on the Lower Cretaceous rocks of Lincolnshire. Proceedings of the Geologists’ Association 52, 198–207.
Swinnerton H.H. (1943)  Belemnites from East Greenland. Ann. Mag. Nat. Hist. Ser. II 10 (66), 406–410.
Swinnerton H.H. (1936–1955) A Monograph of British Cretaceous Belemnites.  Lower Cretaceous.  Palaeontographical Society, London 1–5, 1–86.
Swinnerton H.H. & Kent P.E. (1949) The Geology of Lincolnshire (Lincolnshire Natural History Brochure No. 1.) Lincoln, Lincolnshire Naturalists' Union 1949 (2nd Ed, 1981).
Swinnerton H.H. (1958) The Earth Beneath Us Harmondsworth: Pelican .
Swinnerton H.H. (1960) Fossils (New Naturalist Series). London: Collins.

References

External links
 Swinnerton (1910) Nottinghamshire, Cambridge County Geographies

1875 births
1966 deaths
Academics of the University of Nottingham
New Naturalist writers
Members of the Lincolnshire Naturalists' Union